Valery Goncharov (born 1 March 1966) is a Soviet diver. He competed in the men's 3 metre springboard event at the 1988 Summer Olympics.

References

1966 births
Living people
Soviet male divers
Olympic divers of the Soviet Union
Divers at the 1988 Summer Olympics
Sportspeople from Kharkiv